CNN (Cable News Network) is a multinational  news channel and website headquartered in Atlanta, Georgia, U.S.  Founded in 1980 by American media proprietor Ted Turner and Reese Schonfeld as a 24-hour cable news channel, and presently owned by the Manhattan-based media conglomerate Warner Bros. Discovery (WBD), CNN was the first television channel to provide 24-hour news coverage and the first all-news television channel in the United States.

As of February 2023, CNN had 80 million television households as subscribers in the US. According to Nielsen, in June 2021 CNN ranked third in viewership among cable news networks, behind Fox News and MSNBC, averaging 580,000 viewers throughout the day, down 49% from a year earlier, amid sharp declines in viewers across all cable news networks. While CNN ranked 14th among all basic cable networks in 2019, then jumped to 7th during a major surge for the three largest cable news networks (completing a rankings streak of Fox News at number 5 and MSNBC at number 6 for that year), it settled back to number 11 in 2021 and had further declined to number 21 in 2022.

Globally, CNN programming has aired through CNN International, seen by viewers in over 212 countries and territories; since May 2019, however, the US domestic version has absorbed international news coverage in order to reduce programming costs. The American version, sometimes referred to as CNN (US), is also available in Canada, some islands of the Caribbean and in Japan, where it was first broadcast on CNNj in 2003, with simultaneous translation in Japanese.

History

The Cable News Network launched at 5:00 p.m. Eastern Time on June 1, 1980. After an introduction by Ted Turner, the husband and wife team of David Walker and Lois Hart anchored the channel's first newscast. Burt Reinhardt, the executive vice president of CNN, hired most of the channel's first 200 employees, including the network's first news anchor, Bernard Shaw.

Since its debut, CNN has expanded its reach to several cable and satellite television providers, websites, and specialized closed-circuit channels (such as CNN Airport). The company has 42 bureaus (11 domestic, 31 international), more than 900 affiliated local stations (which also receive news and features content via the video newswire service CNN Newsource), and several regional and foreign-language networks around the world. The channel's success made a bona-fide mogul of founder Ted Turner and set the stage for conglomerate Time Warner's (later WarnerMedia which merged with Discovery Inc. forming Warner Bros. Discovery) eventual acquisition of the Turner Broadcasting System in 1996.

Programming

CNN's current weekday schedule consists mostly of rolling news programming during daytime hours, followed by in-depth news and information programs during the evening and prime time hours. The network's morning programming consists of Early Start, an early-morning news program hosted by Christine Romans and Laura Jarrett at 5–6 a.m. ET, which is followed by CNN This Morning, the network's morning show, hosted by Don Lemon, Poppy Harlow and Kaitlan Collins at 6–9 a.m. ET. Most of CNN's late-morning and early afternoon programming consists of CNN Newsroom, a rolling news program hosted by Jim Sciutto in the morning and by a rotating CNN anchor, Victor Blackwell, and Alisyn Camerota or another rotating CNN anchor in the afternoon. In between the editions of Newsroom, At This Hour with Kate Bolduan airs at 11 a.m.–noon ET, followed by Inside Politics, hosted by John King at noon–1 p.m. ET.

CNN's late afternoon and early evening lineup consists of The Lead with Jake Tapper at 4–5 p.m. ET and The Situation Room with Wolf Blitzer at 5–7 p.m. ET. the programs are sometimes anchored by Brianna Keilar and/or John Berman when Tapper and Blitzer are not present. The network's evening and prime time lineup shifts towards more in-depth programming, including Erin Burnett OutFront at 7 p.m. ET, Anderson Cooper 360° at 8 p.m. ET, and CNN Primetime at 9 p.m. ET, which features a rotation of various special reports and interviews. The 10 p.m. and 11 p.m. hours are filled by CNN Tonight, which are anchored by Laura Coates and Alisyn Camerota respectively.

Weekend primetime—from 9 p.m. ET on Saturday and 8 p.m. ET on Sunday—is dedicated mostly to factual programming, such as documentary specials and miniseries, and documentary-style reality series (such as Anthony Bourdain: Parts Unknown and United Shades of America), as well as acquired documentary films presented under the banner CNN Films. The network's weekend morning programming consists of CNN Newsroom (simulcast from CNN International) at 4–6 a.m. ET every Saturday and 3–6 a.m. ET every Sunday, which is followed by the weekend editions of CNN This Morning, hosted by Amara Walker and Boris Sanchez, which airs every Saturday at 6–9 a.m. ET and Sunday at 6–8 a.m. ET, and the network's Saturday program Smerconish with Michael Smerconish at 9 a.m. ET. Sunday morning lineup consists primarily of political talk shows, including Inside Politics Sunday, hosted by Abby Phillip at 8 a.m. ET, State of the Union, co-hosted by Jake Tapper and Dana Bash at 9 a.m. ET and repeated at noon ET, and the international affairs program Fareed Zakaria GPS, hosted by Fareed Zakaria at 10 a.m. ET and repeated at 1 p.m. ET. Weekend programming other than aforementioned slots is filled with CNN Newsroom.

For the 2014–15 season, after cancelling Piers Morgan Tonight (which, itself, replaced the long-running Larry King Live), CNN experimented with running factual and reality-style programming during the 9:00 p.m. ET hour, such as John Walsh's The Hunt, This Is Life with Lisa Ling, and Mike Rowe's Somebody's Gotta Do It. Then-president Jeff Zucker explained that this new lineup was intended to shift CNN away from a reliance on pundit-oriented programs, and attract younger demographics to the network. Zucker stated that the 9:00 p.m. hour could be pre-empted during major news events for expanded coverage. These changes coincided with the introduction of a new imaging campaign for the network, featuring the slogan "Go there". In May 2014, CNN premiered The Sixties, a documentary miniseries produced by Tom Hanks, and Gary Goetzman which chronicled the United States in the 1960s. Owing to its success, CNN commissioned follow-ups focusing on other decades. Anderson Cooper 360° was expanded to run two hours long, from 8 PM to 10 PM.

By 2019, CNN had produced at least 35 original series. Alongside the Hanks/Goetzman franchise (including the 2018 spin-off 1968), CNN has aired other documentary miniseries relating to news and U.S. policies, such as The Bush Years, and American Dynasties: The Kennedys—which saw the highest ratings of any CNN original series premiere to-date, with 1.7 million viewers. Parts Unknown concluded after the 2018 suicide of its host Anthony Bourdain; CNN announced several new miniseries and docuseries for 2019, including American Style (a miniseries produced by the digital media company Vox Media), The Redemption Project with Van Jones, Chasing Life with Sanjay Gupta, Tricky Dick (a miniseries chronicling Richard Nixon), The Movies (a spin-off of the Hanks/Goetzman decades miniseries), and Once in a Great City: Detroit 1962–64.

With the takeover of CNN by Chris Licht and Warner Bros. Discovery, it was announced in October 2022 that CNN would cut back on acquisitions and commissions from third-parties as a cost-cutting measure, but Licht stressed that "longform content remains an important pillar of our programming", while the network announced a slate for 2023 that would include commissions such as Giuliani: What Happened to America’s Mayor?, United States of Scandal, and The 2010s.

On-air presentation
CNN began broadcasting in the high-definition 1080i resolution format in September 2007. This format is now standard for CNN and is available on all major cable and satellite providers.

CNN's political coverage in HD was first given mobility by the introduction of the CNN Election Express bus in October 2007. The Election Express vehicle, capable of five simultaneous HD feeds, was used for the channel's CNN-YouTube presidential debates and for presidential candidate interviews.

In December 2008, CNN introduced a comprehensive redesign of its on-air appearance, which replaced an existing style that had been used since 2004. On-air graphics took a rounded, flat look in a predominantly black, white, and red color scheme, and the introduction of a new box next to the CNN logo for displaying show logos and segment-specific graphics, rather than as a large banner above the lower-third. The redesign also replaced the scrolling ticker with a static "flipper", which could either display a feed of news headlines (both manually inserted and taken from the RSS feeds of CNN.com), or "topical" details related to a story.

CNN's next major redesign was introduced on January 10, 2011, replacing the dark, flat appearance of the 2008 look with a glossier, blue and white color scheme, and moving the secondary logo box to the opposite end of the screen. Additionally, the network began to solely produce its programming in the 16:9 aspect ratio, with standard definition feeds using a letterboxed version of the HD feed. On February 18, 2013, the "flipper" was dropped and reverted to a scrolling ticker; originally displayed as a blue background with white text, the ticker was reconfigured a day later with blue text on a white background to match the look of the 'flipper'.

On August 11, 2014, CNN introduced a new graphics package, dropping the glossy appearance for a flat, rectangular scheme incorporating red, white, and black colors, and the Gotham typeface. The ticker now alternates between general headlines and financial news from CNN Business, and the secondary logo box was replaced with a smaller box below the CNN bug, which displays either the title, hashtag, or Twitter handle for the show being aired or its anchor. In April 2016, CNN began to introduce a new corporate typeface, known as "CNN Sans", across all of its platforms. Inspired by Helvetica Neue and commissioned after consultations with Troika Design Group, the font family consists of 30 different versions with varying weights and widths to facilitate use across print, television, and digital mediums.

In August 2016, CNN announced the launch of CNN Aerial Imagery and Reporting (CNN AIR), a drone-based news collecting operation to integrate aerial imagery and reporting across all CNN branches and platforms, along with Turner Broadcasting and Time Warner entities.

Staff

On July 27, 2012, CNN president Jim Walton announced he was resigning after 30 years at the network. Walton remained with CNN until the end of that year. In January 2013, former NBCUniversal President Jeff Zucker replaced Walton.

On January 29, 2013, longtime political analysts James Carville and Mary Matalin, and fellow political contributor Erick Erickson were let go by CNN.

In February 2022, Zucker was asked to resign by Jason Kilar, the chief executive of CNN's owner WarnerMedia, after Zucker's relationship with one of his lieutenants was discovered during the investigation into former CNN primetime host Chris Cuomo's efforts to control potentially damaging reporting regarding his brother Andrew Cuomo, governor of New York. Kilar announced that the interim co-heads would be executive vice presidents Michael Bass, Amy Entelis, and Ken Jautz.  On February 26, 2022, it was announced that Chris Licht—known for his work at MSNBC and CBS—would be the next president of CNN; he was planned to be instated after the spin off and merger of WarnerMedia into Discovery Inc. Licht started his tenure in May 2022.

Other platforms

Website
CNN launched its website, CNN.com (initially known as CNN Interactive), on August 30, 1995. The site attracted growing interest over its first decade and is now one of the most popular news websites in the world. The widespread growth of blogs, social media and user-generated content have influenced the site, and blogs in particular have focused CNN's previously scattershot online offerings, most noticeably in the development and launch of CNN Pipeline in late 2005.

In April 2009, CNN.com ranked third place among online global news sites in unique users in the U.S., according to Nielsen/NetRatings; with an increase of 11% over the previous year.

CNN Pipeline was the name of a paid subscription service, its corresponding website, and a content delivery client that provided streams of live video from up to four sources (or "pipes"), on-demand access to CNN stories and reports, and optional pop-up "news alerts" to computer users. The installable client was available to users of PCs running Microsoft Windows. There was also a browser-based "web client" that did not require installation. The service was discontinued in July 2007, and was replaced with a free streaming service.

On April 18, 2008, CNN.com was targeted by Chinese hackers in retaliation for the channel's coverage on the 2008 Tibetan unrest. CNN reported that they took preventive measures after news broke of the impending attack.

The company was honored at the 2008 Technology & Engineering Emmy Awards for development and implementation of an integrated and portable IP-based live, edit and store-and-forward digital news gathering (DNG) system. The first use of what would later win CNN this award was in April 2001 when CNN correspondent Lisa Rose Weaver covered, and was detained, for the release of the U.S. Navy crew of a damaged electronic surveillance plane after the Hainan Island incident. The technology consisted of a videophone produced by 7E Communications Ltd of London, UK. This DNG workflow is used today by the network to receive material worldwide using an Apple MacBook Pro, various prosumer and professional digital cameras, software from Streambox Inc., and BGAN terminals from Hughes Network Systems.

On October 24, 2009, CNN launched a new version of the CNN.com website; the revamped site included the addition of a new "sign up" option, in which users can create their own username and profile, and a new "CNN Pulse" (beta) feature, along with a new red color theme. However, most of the news stories archived on the website were deleted.

Blogs
The topical news program Judy Woodruff's Inside Politics was the first CNN program to feature a round-up of blogs in 2005. Blog coverage was expanded when Inside Politics was folded into The Situation Room (Inside Politics later returned to CNN in 2014, this time hosted by the network's chief national correspondent John King.). In 2006, CNN launched CNN Exchange and CNN iReport, initiatives designed to further introduce and centralize the impact of everything from blogging to citizen journalism within the CNN brand. CNN iReport which features user-submitted photos and video, has achieved considerable traction, with increasingly professional-looking reports filed by amateur journalists, many still in high school or college. The iReport gained more prominence when observers of the Virginia Tech shootings sent-in first hand photos of what was going on during the shootings.

In April 2010, CNN announced via Twitter that it would launch a food blog called "Eatocracy," which will "cover all news related to food – from recalls to health issues to culture". CNN had an internet relay chat (IRC) network at chat.cnn.com. CNN placed a live chat with Benjamin Netanyahu on the network in 1998.

CNNHealth consists of expert doctors answering viewers' questions online at CNN's "The Chart" blog website. Contributors include Drs. Sanjay Gupta (Chief Medical Correspondent), Charles Raison (Mental Health Expert), Otis Brawley (Conditions Expert), Melina Jampolis (Diet and Fitness Expert), Jennifer Shu (Living Well Expert), and Elizabeth Cohen (Senior Medical Correspondent).

Other digital offerings

In early 2008, CNN began maintaining a live streaming broadcast available to cable and satellite subscribers who receive CNN at home (a precursor to the TV Everywhere services that would become popularized by cable and satellite providers beginning with Time Warner's incorporation of the medium). CNN International is broadcast live, as part of the RealNetworks SuperPass subscription service outside the U.S. CNN also offers several RSS feeds and podcasts.

CNN also has multiple channels in the popular video-sharing site YouTube, but those videos can only be viewed in the United States, a source of criticism among YouTube users worldwide. In 2014, CNN launched a radio version of their television programming on TuneIn Radio. The network also hosts CNN-10, a daily 10-minute video show visible at the CNN website or YouTube. It replaced the long-running show CNN Student News which had been aired since 1989. It is aimed at a global audience of students, teachers, and adults, and was hosted by Carl Azuz.In fall of 2022, Carl Azuz was replaced by Coy Wire as the host of CNN 10, after leaving CNN due to a "personal decision" according to a CNN spokesperson in a newsletter published on September 18, 2022.

On March 7, 2017, CNN announced the official launch of its virtual reality unit named CNNVR. It will produce 360 videos to its Android and iOS apps within CNN Digital. It is planning to cover major news events with the online, and digital news team in New York City, Atlanta, London, Hong Kong, San Francisco, Dubai, Johannesburg, Tokyo, and Beijing.

CNN Newsource is a subscription-based affiliation video service that provides CNN content to television station affiliates with CNN, including terrestrial stations and international stations. Newsource allows affiliates to download video from CNN, as well as from other affiliates who upload their video to Newsource.

CNN also maintains a wire service known as CNN Wire.

CNN's digital storefront, which sells branded merchandise, household goods, and software, is operated by StackCommerce via partnership.

In 2021, CNN Digital had an average of 144 million unique visitors in the United States according to Comscore, making it the most viewed digital news outlet, ahead of The New York Times, NBC News, Fox News, The Washington Post.

Beme

On November 28, 2016, CNN announced the acquisition of Beme for a reported $25 million. On November 29, 2016, Matt Hackett, co-founder of Beme, announced via an email to its users that the Beme app would be shutting down on January 31, 2017. Since the shutdown of the app, it was announced that CNN intended to use the current talent behind Beme to work on a separate start-up endeavor. Beme's current team will retain full creative control of the new project, which was slated to release in summer 2017. Beme have also brought on other internet stars such as the host of Vsauce 3, Jake Roper, as head of production, who features prominently in Beme co-founder Casey Neistat's vlogs. Beme News has since begun uploading news related video on YouTube.

Films

In October 2012, CNN formed a film division called CNN Films to distribute and produce made-for-TV and feature documentaries. Its first acquisition was a documentary entitled Girl Rising, a documentary narrated by Meryl Streep that focused on the struggles of girls' education.

Radio
In July 2014, Cumulus Media announced that it would end its partnership with ABC News Radio, and enter into a new partnership with CNN to syndicate national and international news content for its stations through Westwood One beginning in 2015, including access to a wire service, and digital content for its station websites. This service is unbranded, allowing individual stations to integrate the content with their own news brands.

As of February 2019, the audio simulcast of CNN is distributed on Entercom's Radio.com website and app.

Specialized channels

Over the years, CNN has launched spin-off networks in the United States and other countries. Channels that currently operate  include:
 CNN Brazil – a Brazilian news channel that launched on March 15, 2020. (licensed to Novus Media)
 CNN Chile – a Chilean news channel that launched on December 4, 2008.
 CNN en Español
 CNN International
 CNN Türk – a Turkish media outlet.
 CNN-News18 – an Indian news channel. (licensed to Network 18)
 CNN Indonesia – an Indonesian news channel that launched on August 17, 2015. (licensed to Trans Media)
 CNNj – a Japanese news outlet.
 CNN/US HD – launched for American viewers in late 2010, and is distributed by Japan Cable Television (JCTV) to several different multi-channel TV providers, such as J:COM, SKY PerfecTV!, iTSCOM and the JCTVWiFi service.
 CNN Philippines – a Filipino news channel launched on March 16, 2015. (licensed to Nine Media Corporation and Radio Philippines Network (RPN))
 CNN Prima News – a Czech news channel. (that launched on May 3, 2020, licensed to Prima Group)
 A2 CNN – an Albanian news channel.
 Antena 3 CNN – a Romanian news channel. (licensed to Intact Media Group)
 HLN
 CNN Portugal – a Portuguese news channel launched on November 22, 2021. (licensed to Media Capital)

Former channels
CNN has also launched television and online ventures that are no longer in operation, including:
 CNN Airport
 CNN Checkout Channel (out-of-home place-based custom channel for grocery stores that started in 1991 and shuttered in 1993)
 CNN Italia (an Italian news website launched in partnership with the publishing company Gruppo Editoriale L'Espresso, and after with the financial newspaper Il Sole 24 Ore, it launched on November 15, 1999 and closed on September 12, 2003)
 CNN Pipeline (24-hour multi-channel broadband online news service, replaced with CNN.com Live)
 CNN Sports Illustrated (also known as CNNSI; U.S. sports news channel, closed in 2002)
 CNN+ (a partner channel in Spain, launched in 1999 joint venture with Sogecable).
 CNN.com Live
 CNNfn (financial channel, closed in December 2004)
 CNN Money Switzerland (Switzerland financial channel, joint venture with MediaGo)

Experiments
CNN launched two specialty news channels for the American market which would later close amid competitive pressure: the sports news channel CNNSI shut down in 2002, while business news channel CNNfn shut down after nine years on the air in December 2004. CNN had a partnership with Sports Illustrated through the sports website CNNSI.com, but sold the domain name in May 2015. CNNfn's former website used to redirect to money.cnn.com, a product of CNN's strategic partnership with Money magazine. Money and Sports Illustrated were both Time Warner properties until 2014, when the company's magazine division was spun off into the separate Time Inc.

CNN also launched "Great Big Story" in November 2015 to produce content tailored toward younger viewers.  It was eventually shut down in September 2020 after building a following of nearly 6 million followers on both Facebook and YouTube.

Bureaus

CNN operates bureaus in the following cities .  

United States

 Atlanta (World Headquarters)
 New York City (parent Warner Bros. Discovery World Headquarters)
 Chicago
 Dallas
 Denver
 Los Angeles
 Miami
 Philadelphia
 San Francisco
 Washington, D.C.

Worldwide

 Abu Dhabi, United Arab Emirates 
 Amman, Jordan
 Bangkok, Thailand
 Beijing, China
 Beirut, Lebanon
 Berlin, Germany
 Buenos Aires, Argentina
 Cairo, Egypt
 Dubai, United Arab Emirates
 Havana, Cuba
 Hong Kong, China
 Islamabad, Pakistan
 Istanbul, Turkey
 South Jakarta, Indonesia
 Jerusalem, Israel
 Johannesburg, South Africa
 Kabul, Afghanistan
 Lagos, Nigeria
 Lisbon, Portugal
 London, United Kingdom
 Manila, Philippines
 Mexico City, Mexico
 Moscow, Russia
 Nairobi, Kenya
 New Delhi, India
 Paris, France
 Rome, Italy
 Santiago, Chile
 São Paulo, Brazil
 Seoul, South Korea
 Tokyo, Japan

In parts of the world without a CNN bureau, reports from local affiliate stations will be used to file a story.

Controversies and criticisms

CNN has been involved in various controversies, criticisms and allegations since its inception in 1980. The channel is known for its dramatic live coverage of breaking news, some of which has drawn criticism as overly sensationalistic. CNN claims to be "The Most Trusted Name in News", but its efforts to be nonpartisan have led to accusations of false balance. CNN has also been accused of having had a liberal bias during the Trump administration.

Awards and honors

1998: CNN received the Four Freedom Award for the Freedom of Speech.

2017: CNN received the Prince Rainier III Special Prize at Monte Carlo TV Festival for the documentary, Midway: A Plastic Island about sea pollution.

2018: CNN received the Overseas Press Club of America David Kaplan Award for best TV or video spot news reporting from abroad for reporting on the fall of ISIS. Reporting done by Nick Paton Walsh and Arwa Damon.

2018: CNN received the George Polk Award for Foreign Television Reporting for uncovering a hidden modern-day slave auction of African refugees in Libya. Reporting done by Nima Elbagir and Raja Razek.

2018: CNN's Nima Elbagir to receive 2018 Courage in Journalism Award from the International Women's Media Foundation.

2018: CNN won a network-record six news & documentary Emmy Awards. They are, Outstanding Breaking News Coverage, Outstanding Continuing Coverage of a News Story in a Newscast, Outstanding Live Interview, Outstanding Hard News Feature Story in a Newscast, Outstanding News Special, Outstanding Science, Medical and Environmental Report.

2019: The USC Annenberg School awarded CNN with a Walter Cronkite Award for its Parkland Town Hall.

2020: CNN's Ed Lavandera was awarded a Peabody for "The Hidden Workforce: Undocumented in America". CNN Films was awarded a Peabody for the documentary "Apollo 11".

2021: CNN won a George Polk Award for Foreign Reporting for their reporting on the coronavirus outbreak in Wuhan, China and later under quarantine in Beijing. CNN and Clarissa Ward were named finalists for the duPont-Columbia Award for their "Russia's Secret Influence Campaigns" investigation.

See also

 Broadcasting
 Journalistic objectivity
 List of CNN personnel
 Mass media
 Media bias in the United States
 News media
 News media in the United States
 TeleSUR
 Television studio

References

External links

 
 

 
1980 establishments in Georgia (U.S. state)
Television channels and stations established in 1980
Television networks in the United States
English-language television stations in the United States
24-hour television news channels in the United States
Sirius XM Radio channels
Warner Bros. Discovery networks 
Companies based in Atlanta
Podcasting companies
Peabody Award winners
Recipients of the Four Freedoms Award
Webby Award winners